Harry Oliver Middleton (born 12 April 1995) is an English former professional footballer who played as a midfielder.

He began his career at Doncaster Rovers, making his first-team debut in November 2012. He established himself in the first-team in the 2015–16 relegation campaign, before helping Rovers to secure promotion out of League Two in 2016–17. He signed with Port Vale in August 2017, and was loaned out to Halifax Town three months later. He signed with Alfreton Town in August 2018 and moved on to Gainsborough Trinity three months later. He joined Cleethorpes Town in December 2019 and also had brief spells with Grantham Town and Barton Town. He became a police officer in 2022.

Career

Doncaster Rovers
Middleton began his career at Doncaster Rovers, and was part of the Academy team that won the Youth Alliance Cup with a 4–0 win over Exeter City at St James Park in 2012. He made his first-team debut in the League Trophy area quarter-final match against Crewe Alexandra at the Alexandra Stadium on 4 November 2012; Rovers drew 1–1 and lost the resulting penalty shoot-out. He was one of six youth team players to be given a one-year professional contract by the club in July 2013.

He made his second first-team appearance on 7 October 2014, in a 3–0 victory at Burton Albion in the League Trophy, coming on as an 87th-minute substitute. He made his League One debut on 28 December, coming on for Marc de Val 34 minutes into a 0–0 draw at Peterborough United. Speaking after the match, manager Paul Dickov said Middleton was close to starting a first-team game and that "he's been slightly unfortunate with the form of Paul Keegan, Richie Wellens, Marc de Val and Dean Furman being ahead of him". He made his first start for "Donny" on 14 April, in a 0–0 draw at Leyton Orient. Coach Rob Jones had also appointed him as captain of the youth team for the 2014–15 season, and Middleton helped the squad to a second-place finish in the Final Third Development League, before he signed a new two-year contract in June 2015.

He worked with the club's new nutritionist in the 2015–16 pre-season, and bulked up significantly as a result. He established himself as a first-team regular, making 41 appearances across the campaign, however Doncaster were relegated into League Two. He signed a new three-and-a-half year deal in December 2015. He made six starts and 19 substitute appearances in League Two in the 2016–17 season as Rovers finished in third-place to secure automatic promotion at the first attempt. However he was one of five players transfer listed in May 2017. Two months later manager Darren Ferguson said the only enquiries made for Middleton came from Swindon Town, who did not make any formal offer, and he went on to criticise Middleton's agent for failing to find him a move away from the Keepmoat Stadium.

Port Vale
On 31 August 2017, Middleton signed a one-year contract with newly relegated League Two side Port Vale, as manager Michael Brown's 19th summer signing. On 11 November 2017, he was allowed to join F.C. Halifax Town on loan, a National League club previously coached by new "Valiants" manager Neil Aspin. Middleton said "I didn't see coming here as a step back. I saw it as a way to kick-start my career". He was released upon the expiry of his contract at Vale Park in May 2018.

Non-League
On 1 August 2018, Middleton signed a one-year contract with National League North side Alfreton Town. After three months at North Street, during which time he featured just six times from the bench, he left the "Reds" and joined Northern Premier League Premier Division club Gainsborough Trinity. Trinity manager Lee Sinnott said that "we wanted to supplement what we already have, and he will keep things fresh in the middle of the park". The "Holy Blues" ended the 2018–19 season in sixth-place, one point outside the play-offs; Middleton signed a new contract in the summer.

On 13 December 2019, Middleton joined Northern Premier League Division One South East club Cleethorpes Town. He scored his first career goal on 22 February, as he opened the scoring for the "Owls" in a 5–0 victory over Spalding United. The 2019–20 season was abandoned and all results voided due to the COVID-19 pandemic in England. He signed with Northern Premier League Premier Division side Grantham Town on 7 July 2020, joining his brother Ben. However he returned to Cleethorpes by September. He scored two goals in eight games before the 2020–21 season was curtailed due to the ongoing pandemic. He joined Northern Counties East League Premier Division side Barton Town on a dual registration deal on 12 November 2021 after "Swans" midfielder Josh Baker underwent surgery on his foot. He played five games for Barton under player-manager Nathan Jarman. He scored one goal from 29 games for Cleethorpes in the 2021–22 campaign. He retired from football in 2022 in order to become an officer with South Yorkshire Police.

Style of play
Middleton described himself as a creative deep-lying midfielder.

Career statistics

Honours
Doncaster Rovers
EFL League Two third-place promotion: 2016–17

References

Living people
1995 births
Footballers from Doncaster
English footballers
Association football midfielders
Doncaster Rovers F.C. players
Port Vale F.C. players
FC Halifax Town players
Alfreton Town F.C. players
Gainsborough Trinity F.C. players
Cleethorpes Town F.C. players
Grantham Town F.C. players
Barton Town F.C. players
English Football League players
National League (English football) players
Northern Premier League players
Northern Counties East Football League players
British police officers
South Yorkshire Police officers